Brooke Point High School is a public high school located about  south of Washington D.C. in Stafford, Virginia, United States. It is one of five high schools serving Stafford County Public Schools, and enrolls students in grades nine through twelve in the eastern portion of Stafford County. The school was opened in 1993.

Administration 
The principal of Brooke Point High School is Mr. Tim Roberts. Before being appointed principal in 2019, Mr. Roberts was an assistant principal, administrative intern, and a teacher a Brooke Point.

Academics 
Brooke Point High School is accredited by the Virginia State Board of Education and Southern Association of Colleges and Schools, and has earned accreditation as an IB World School as of 2010. Brooke Point students are offered three options for their diploma: traditional, advanced, or IB diploma. They also offer a wide range of Advanced Placement courses.

Athletics 
Brooke Point High School competes in the AAA Commonwealth District of the Virginia High School League (VHSL).

The school takes part in the following sports:

 American football
 Baseball
 Basketball
 Cheerleading
 Cross country
 Field hockey
 Football
 Golf
 Gymnastics
 Lacrosse
 Soccer
 Softball
 Swimming
 Tennis
 Track
 Volleyball
 Wrestling

Notable alumni 
 Erin Cahill - actress

References

External links
School website
District webpage

Stafford County Public Schools
Public high schools in Virginia
Educational institutions established in 1993
1993 establishments in Virginia